The 2014–15 All-Ireland Junior Club Hurling Championship was the 12th staging of the All-Ireland Junior Club Hurling Championship since its establishment by the Gaelic Athletic Association. The championship ran from 5 October 2014 to 15 February 2015.

The All-Ireland final was played on 15 February 2015 at Croke Park in Dublin, between Bennettsbridge from Kilkenny and Fullen Gaels from Warwickshire, in what was their first ever meeting in the final. Bennettsbridge won the match by 3-19 to 1-08 to claim their first ever All-Ireland title.

Bennettsbridge's Nicky Cleere was the championship's top scorer with 1-37.

Connacht Junior Club Hurling Championship

Connacht semi-final

Connacht final

Leinster Junior Club Hurling Championship

Leinster first round

Leinster quarter-finals

Leinster semi-finals

Leinster final

Munster Junior Club Hurling Championship

Munster quarter-finals

Munster semi-final

 Castlemartyr received a bye in this round as there were no Clare representatives.

Munster final

Ulster Junior Club Hurling Championship

Ulster quarter-finals

Ulster semi-finals

Ulster final

All-Ireland Junior Club Hurling Championship

All-Ireland quarter-final

All-Ireland semi-finals

All-Ireland final

Championship statistics

Miscellaneous

 Castleblayney Faughs became the first club to win two Ulster Championship titles.
 Fullen Gaels became the first club to lose two All-Ireland finals.

References

All-Ireland Junior Club Hurling Championship
All-Ireland Junior Club Hurling Championship
All-Ireland Junior Club Hurling Championship